Alan Goldsher is an American author of 15 books, performs on bass and keyboard, and is a music and sports journalist. He lives in Chicago.

Writing
Goldsher has written 15 books, both fiction and non-fiction. His debut novel, Jam, was published in 2002, with the non-fiction Hard Bop Academy: The Sidemen of Art Blakey and the Jazz Messengers appearing the following year. His 2010 novel Paul Is Undead: The British Zombie Invasion received a starred review from Publishers Weekly, where it was described as a "humor-filled splatterfest" having "over-the-top bizarro charm",.

As a ghostwriter, Alan has collaborated on numerous non-fiction and fiction projects with celebrities and public figures including comedian Kevin Pollak, director Tobe Hooper, chef Stephanie Izard, and jazz guitarist and vocalist George Benson. His music journalism has been published in Bass Player and Guitar Player, and his sportswriting has appeared in ESPN The Magazine and at ESPN.com, NBA.com, and ChicagoBulls.com.

Music
A bassist, keyboardist, producer, and record label CEO, Goldsher has released 12 projects on his own Gold Note Records. As a sideman, he has made music with artists including Digable Planets, Cypress Hill, Naughty By Nature, Janet Jackson, Questlove, and King Britt.

Discography

As a leader

Albums & EPs
 A Soundtrack in Search of a Movie (2023)
 Live at the Lakeview Lounge (2022)
 Greatest Hits, Vol. 1: Originals (2021)
 Greatest Hits, Vol. 2: Covers (2021)
 The Electronica Messenger: An EDM Tribute to Art Blskey (2021)
 All We Are (2021)
 Where's Dinner? (2021)
 Digits (2021)
 Glue (2020)
 Still Sticky (2020)
 Big Al Bassman Funks Up the Jazz Classics (2019)
 96 B.P.M. (2019)
 The Other Pocket (2019)
 The Pocket (2019)

Singles
 "Una Noche Con Frances" (2021)
 "Spiral Dance" (2021)
 "F = Funk" (2021)
 "The Return of Vibez McGoo" (2020)
 "Eric B is President" (2020)
 "The Point After" (2020)
 "The Boogoo Reboot" (2020)
 "Jean-Pierre" (2020)
 "The Rumproller" (2020)
 "Ruby Red" (2020)
 "Witch Hunt / Maiden Voyage" (2020)

As a sideman
 Beyond the Spectrum: The Creamy Spy Chronicles by Digable Planets (2005)
 When the Funk Hits the Fan by King Britt (1998)
 Pronounced Jah-Nay by Zhané (1997)
 Blowout Comb by Digable Planets (1994)

Bibliography

Non-fiction
 Digging Dave Brubeck and Time Out! – Post Hill Press, 2020
 Linsanity: The Improbable Rise of Jeremy Lin – Vook, 2012
 Modest Mouse: A Pretty Good Read – Thomas Dunne/St. Martin's Press, 2006
 Hard Bop Academy: The Sidemen of Art Blakey and the Jazz Messengers – Hal Leonard, 2003

Fiction
 "My Favorite Fangs: The Story of the Von Trapp Family Vampires" – Thomas Dunne/St. Martin's Press, 2012
 "A Game of Groans: A Sonnet of Slush and Soot" (as George R.R. Washington) – Thomas Dunne/St. Martin's Press, 2012
 "Paul Is Undead: The British Zombie Invasion – Gallery Books/Simon & Schuster, 2010
 "No Ordinary Girl" (as A. M. Goldsher) – Little Black Dress Books/Hachette, 2010 
 "Today's Special" (as A. M. Goldsher) – Little Black Dress Books/Hachette, 2008 
 "Reality Check" (as A. M. Goldsher) – Little Black Dress Books/Hachette, 2008 
 "The True Naomi Story" (as A. M. Goldsher) – Little Black Dress Books/Hachette, 2008 
 "Jam" – Permanent Press, 2002

References

External links 

 

Year of birth missing (living people)
Living people
American session musicians
American bass guitarists
Guitarists from Illinois
Writers from Illinois
American music critics
American male bass guitarists